Wheatland is an unincorporated community in Yamhill County, Oregon, United States. It is near the Willamette River where the Wheatland Ferry takes traffic across the river into Marion County.

See also
Willamette Mission State Park, across the river from Wheatland
Methodist Mission in Oregon, former settlement now part of the state park
Wheatland Ferry, a historic river crossing and currently the only one between Salem and Newberg
Maud Williamson State Recreation Site, a few miles to the west, donated and named after a teacher who taught at the former Wheatland school

External links
Historic images of Wheatland from Salem Public Library

Unincorporated communities in Yamhill County, Oregon
Populated places on the Willamette River
Unincorporated communities in Oregon